is a yonkoma manga series begun in 1991 by Hisaichi Ishii originally serialized as  in the Asahi Shimbun in Japan. When the series first began, it was generally focused on all of the members of the Yamada family. As the series progressed, the daughter (Nonoko, or "Nono-chan") became the most popular character among readers and more of the strips focused on her and her point of view. In 1997, the series title was changed to reflect this change of focus. The Asahi Shimbun continues to feature this manga series as of October 2007.

In July 1999, Studio Ghibli released My Neighbors the Yamadas, a film based on this series. From 2001 to 2002, a 61 episode anime television series based on the manga was shown on the TV Asahi network in Japan.

Characters

Yamada family

Nonoko is the main character and a very easy-going 3rd grade elementary school student. She is constantly battling to keep the lowest spot in the class (for grades).

Nonoko's mother, a housewife. She is always worrying about what to cook for dinner (usually something that goes with rice, and it usually turns out to be some sort of curry). She is a somewhat sloppy housekeeper as well as being forgetful.

Nonoko's father, an ordinary salaryman. Unlike his wife and daughter, Takashi is a very diligent worker. His car is a piece of junk, and his hobbies include pachinko and golf.

Nonoko's older brother, a junior high school student. He's very good at sociology, but has poor study skills and doesn't do as well in other subjects.

Nonoko's grandmother and Matsuko's mother. She is 70 years old. Shige is very energetic, but a very stubborn and hard boiled grandmother.

The Yamada family's pet dog. He generally has a sullen, grumpy mood.

Studio Ghibli film

See also
Crayon Shin-chan
Chibi Maruko-chan
Sazae-san

References

External links
 

1991 manga
1997 manga
2001 anime television series debuts
2002 Japanese television series endings
Animated television series about children
Animated television series about families
Anime series based on manga
Comedy anime and manga
Futabasha manga
Hisaichi Ishii
Manga adapted into films
Slice of life anime and manga
Toei Animation television
Tokuma Shoten manga
TV Asahi original programming
Works originally published in Asahi Shimbun
Yonkoma
Animated sitcoms